Lisa Havilah is the CEO of the Museum of Applied Arts and Sciences (MAAS) in Sydney, Australia. She has previously directed various arts centres in Sydney, including Carriageworks and Campbelltown Arts Centre.

Early life and education
Havilah grew up on a dairy farm in Berry, NSW. She attended Bomaderry High, But was "disengaged and uninterested". She has said that her passion for art was influenced by her ceramicist mother. She studied painting and creative writing at art school. Due to her father's influence she also studied law, which she has said gave her "a different level of discipline".

Career 
At the age of 21, she and her then boyfriend, now husband, ceramicist Glenn Barkley, managed to find a space and get funding from a youth arts grant, Wollongong Council and BHP to create a new gallery, which they ran for four years.

Havilah was Assistant Director of Casula Powerhouse Arts Centre from 1998 to 2004, and the inaugural Co-Director of Project Contemporary Artspace, Wollongong, New South Wales.

Havilah was Director of Campbelltown Arts Centre from 2005 to 2010, during which time visitor numbers to the centre increased from 30,000 to 190,000 per year, the highest attendance figures for a New South Wales cultural centre outside of metropolitan Sydney.

In 2011, Havilah was announced as the new CEO of Carriageworks. Havilah was responsible for the evolution of Carriageworks into a multi-arts venue, playing host to up to 100 projects a year which included contemporary theatre, dance, visual arts, music, film and fashion and hosting corporate events. During her time at Carriageworks, she created partnerships with major events such as Sydney Festival, Vivid Sydney, Mercedes-Benz Fashion Week Australia (as of 2021 Afterpay Australian Fashion Week) and Sydney Contemporary, as well as expanding the program to include major food events, and visitor numbers grew from 110,000 in 2010, to 1.32 million in 2017.

In November 2018, she announced her resignation from Carriageworks to take up the role of CEO of the Museum of Applied Arts and Sciences (MAAS), starting in January 2019. She became the fourth head of MAAS in 5½ years, who reports to the Minister, manages 197 staff, and is responsible for the care of more than half a million artefacts of interest from a range of fields, including science, engineering, music and fashion. At the time, it was intended that the collections of the Powerhouse Museum (part of MAAS) would be moved in its entirety from its inner-city suburb of Ultimo to a new building in Parramatta, far away from the city centre. (However, after the move evoked much public controversy, on 4 July 2020 it was decided to keep and renovate the Ultimo building instead of demolishing it and relocating its collections, and build an additional venue in Parramatta with reduced floor space.)

Other roles 

In 2013, she was appointed to the ministerial reference group for the New South Wales Government's Arts and Cultural Policy Framework.

In May 2016, Havilah addressed the Currency House Creativity and Business Breakfast Series with a lecture titled "The Next Generation of Cultural Institution."

In 2017, she was part of an Australian Financial Review panel who selected "the top 10 people who wield the most cultural power in Australia".

Havilah has been a member of the City of Sydney's Public Art Advisory Panel, and of the Barangaroo Delivery Authority's Arts and Public Program Panel, which oversees the Barangaroo Public Art and Cultural Plan.

Awards and honours 
In 2013, FBi Radio awarded Havilah "SMAC (Sydney Music, Arts & Culture) of the Year," stating that she was "one of our city's most dynamic and hard-working cultural figures".

In 2016, while under Havilah's direction, Carriageworks was awarded the New South Wales Government's NSW Creative Laureate award, with NSW Industry, Resources and Energy Minister Anthony Roberts saying that under Havilah's leadership Carriageworks had “skilfully balanced commercial, entrepreneurial and artistic imperatives”.

References

Further reading

Australian businesspeople

Year of birth missing (living people)
Living people